Fleuret was one of a dozen s built for the  (French Navy) during the late 1930s. The ship was completed during the Battle of France in mid-1940 and her first mission was to help escort a battleship to Dakar, French West Africa, only days before the French signed an armistice with the Germans. After the British attack on Dakar in September, she was one of four destroyers ordered to attack British shipping, although there was only an inconclusive duel with a British destroyer. Fleuret helped to escort one of the battleships damaged by the British during their July attack on Mers-el-Kébir, French Algeria, back to France in November and was then reduced to reserve.

When the Germans occupied Vichy France after the Allies landed in French North Africa in November 1942 and tried to seize the French fleet, the destroyer was one of the ships scuttled to prevent their capture. The ship was refloated in 1951 and later scrapped.

Design and description
They were powered by two geared steam turbines, each driving one propeller shaft, using steam provided by four Sural-Penhöet forced-circulation boilers. The crew consisted of 10 officers and 177 enlisted men.

The main armament of the Le Hardi-class ships consisted of six Canon de  Modèle 1932 guns in three twin-gun mounts, one forward and a superfiring pair aft of the superstructure. Their anti-aircraft armament consisted of one twin mount for  Modèle 1925 guns and two twin mounts Hotchkiss  Modèle 1929 anti-aircraft machine guns. The ships carried one triple and two twin sets of  torpedo tubes, one pair on each broadside between the funnels as well as one triple mount aft of the rear funnel able to traverse to both sides. One depth charge chute was built into the stern that housed eight  depth charges. The other side of the stern was intended to be used for the handling gear for a "Ginocchio" anti-submarine torpedo, but this was removed before Fleuret was completed.

Construction and career
Ordered on 31 December 1935, Fleuret was laid down by Forges et Chantiers de la Méditerranée at their shipyard in La Seyne-sur-Mer on 18 August 1936. She was launched on 28 July 1938, commissioned on 10 May 1940 and entered service on 11 June. The following day, the ship sailed from Toulon to Casablanca, French Morocco to help to escort the battleship  from Casablanca to Dakar before the French armistice with the Axis Powers. Together with the large destroyer , Fleuret escorted three passenger ships to Casablanca, 17–23 August. Later that month, she began escorting convoys from Casablanca to various ports in Occupied France. They encountered only an unidentified British destroyer; Fleurets fire-control director malfunctioned and she was unable to engage her opponent at all. The ships continued onward to Oran, French Algeria, and Fleuret later returned to Casablanca on 7 October.

The following months saw five of the Le Hardi-class ships ordered to Oran to escort the battleship , which had been damaged during the attack on Mers-el-Kébir, to Toulon; Fleuret arrived there on 15 October. Departing on 6 November, they arrived at Toulon two days later at which time the ship was reduced to reserve. On 1 April 1941, Fleuret was renamed Foudroyant to commemorate the destroyer of that name that had been sunk during the Dunkirk evacuation in 1940. When the Germans attempted to capture the French ships in Toulon intact on 27 November 1942, Foudroyant, still in reserve, was scuttled by her crew. The ship was damaged by a bomb during an Allied bombing raid on 7 March 1944 and was scuttled by the Germans as a blockship in the main channel on 17 August. She was finally refloated in 1951 and scrapped in 1957.

Notes

References

Further reading
 

Le Hardi-class destroyers
Naval ships of France captured by Italy during World War II
1938 ships
World War II warships scuttled at Toulon
Maritime incidents in November 1942